Aces of the Turf (French: Les as du turf) is a 1932 French comedy sports film directed by Serge de Poligny and starring Paul Pauley, Alexandre Dréan and Josyane. It was made at Joinville Studios by the French subsidiary of Paramount Pictures. In 1935, it was released in the United States with the alternative title of Racetrack Winners.

Cast
 Paul Pauley as Lafleur  
 Alexandre Dréan as Papillon  
 Josyane as Ginette  
 Janett Flo as Lulu  
 Marcel Barencey as Le patron  
 Henri Jullien as Le bookmaker  
 Madeleine Guitty as La cuisinière  
 Jeanne Fusier-Gir as La directrice de l'atelier  
 Georges Bever as Le commissaire-priseur 
 Katia Lova 
 Pierre Labry 
 Raymond Aimos

References

Bibliography 
 Dayna Oscherwitz & MaryEllen Higgins. The A to Z of French Cinema. Scarecrow Press, 2009.

External links 
 

1932 films
1930s sports comedy films
French sports comedy films
1930s French-language films
Films directed by Serge de Poligny
French horse racing films
Films shot at Joinville Studios
French black-and-white films
Paramount Pictures films
1930s French films